The North Shore Albions were a rugby league club based on the North Shore of Auckland in Devonport before moving to Bayswater at a later time.  They formed in 1909 and folded in the early 2000s due to a lack of playing numbers. At the start of the 1920 season they were renamed Devonport United when they amalgamated with the Sunnyside club. It was proposed at the merger that they be known as North Shore Albions but Sunnyside objected and the name of Devonport United was chosen. In 1937, 17 years later at their annual general meeting they decided to revert to the name "North Shore Albions" as they had been commonly referred to as "shore" for many years. Chairman H. Mann made the proposal and it was adopted by the club. Aside from Northcote and Birkenhead Ramblers they were the only club on the North Shore at that time. They closed their doors in 2005. The only remaining club connected to them are the Northern Brothers who are based at Ngataringa Bay Sports Field. Their senior team is an amalgamation of East Coast Bays Barracudas and Glenfield Greyhounds but are based more in the North Shore Albions traditional area which includes the navy ground which has provided many players and teams over the years. The predominant colours are black and green which have been common colours of all the North Shore clubs over the decades.

History

1909-1919
They were formed in 1909 when the Auckland Rugby League competition was in its infancy, having its own first General Meeting that same season.

They were officially born on the evening of 23 July 1909 when a meeting was held at the Devonport Council Chambers. The following people were elected officers for the inaugural season: President – Dr. Guinness, Vice Presidents – Dr. Bennett, Captain Pilkington, Mr W. Swinnerton, Mr. A. Goldwater, and Mr. D. W. McLean, Committee – Mr. F. Gladding, Mr. P. Gerrard, Mr. Clark, Mr. Marshall, Mr. Wells, and Mr. Powell, with Mr. A. J. Powley the Secretary and Treasurer.

They played in the first ever rugby league match between two Auckland club teams when they played City Rovers at Eagleton's Paddock in Epsom. North Shore put out a strong side and won the match by 44 points to 22. Their team was made up of the following players: F. Neighbour, F. Gladding, Richard Wynyard, Gerrard, George Seagar, Frank Woodward, Griffin, B. Wells, Allen, C. Wells, Percival, Shaw, McReynolds, Marshall, Powell, William Wynyard, McDonald, and Stevens.

They also played one match on the Devonport Domain that year against a combined town team which they won by 26 points to 10.

They then finished the year with a match against Newton Rangers at Victoria Park on September 4.

In 1913 North Shore won their first ever first grade championship. They finished the season with a 5 win, 1 draw, 1 loss record, with their 11 competition points three ahead of Newton Rangers, City Rovers, and Ponsonby United all on 8.

In 1914 North Shore was tied with Ponsonby United after 9 rounds with 15 competition points each. This meant a final was required to find the champion. North Shore won by 13 points to 2 on Victoria Park before a crowd of 7,000.

1920-1929
 The 1920s were a fairly mediocre decade for the North Shore senior side. They finished in the middle of the table most years, though in 1924 Marist Old Boys had 21 competition points and North Shore had 23 competition points but North Shore had played one extra game. The Auckland Rugby League decided that the two sides should meet in a final to decide the title. 

Marist won a gripping game 20-17 to deny North Shore their third first grade championship. 

North Shore won the first grade championship for the 3rd time in 1928. At this time it was named the Monteith Shield and was replaced by the Fox Memorial Shield in 1931. They had a 9 win, 3 loss record and finished 3 competition points ahead of the Richmond Rovers. The following year in 1929 they were tied with Ponsonby United after the final round so a final was played however they lost 5-0 before 11,000 at Carlaw Park.

1930-1939
In 1931 North Shore played against Eastern Suburbs from Sydney. The match was played on October 10 at Carlaw Park before a crowd of 17,000. North Shore lost a high scoring match by 41 points to 27.

Then a week later on October 17 a combined North Shore and Marist side played the same opponent and won 14 to 13 before 15,000 at Carlaw Park.

Titles
They were particularly successful in their early years. They won the senior grade 6 times from 1913 to 1941, while they won the minor premiership (Rukutai Shield) 3 times from 1941 to 1955. As Auckland grew and the North Shore gentrified North Shore struggled to remain the power house it once was and it dropped down the grades. Its last notable title was the Norton Cup which they won in 1990 and 1991.

Notable representatives

New Zealand representatives whilst with North Shore

 Ronald MacDonald (1909: North Shore, 1909-11: New Zealand)
 Frederick Stanley Jackson (1910: North Shore, 1910: New Zealand)
 Jim Griffen (1909-19: North Shore, 1910: New Zealand)
 George Seagar (1909-20: North Shore, 1910-11: New Zealand)
 Stan Weston (1911-15: North Shore, 1912-14: New Zealand)
 Karl Ifwersen (1913: North Shore, 1913-20: New Zealand)
 Alfred Jackson (1909-12: North Shore, 1913: New Zealand)
 Stan Walters (1911-20: North Shore, 1913-21: New Zealand)
 Archie Waddell (1919: North Shore, 1919: New Zealand)
 Keith Helander (1919-21: North Shore, 1919: New Zealand)
 Bert Laing (1922-30: North Shore, 1919-25: New Zealand)
 Horace Dixon (1925-30: North Shore, 1925: New Zealand)
 Stan Webb (1922-28: North Shore, 1925-26: New Zealand)
 Neville St George (1921-30: North Shore, 1925: New Zealand)
 James Lawrence O'Brien (1921-28: North Shore, 1925: New Zealand)
 Len Scott (1926-40: North Shore, 1928-36: New Zealand)
 Albert Laing (1931-34: North Shore, 1932: New Zealand)
 Arthur Matthews (1917-18 & 1919-20: North Shore, 1919: New Zealand)
 Verdun Scott (1936-41: North Shore, 1939: New Zealand)
 Allan Seagar (1923-41: North Shore, 1930: New Zealand)
 Dick Smith (1931-35 & 1938-41: North Shore, 1932: New Zealand)
 Ross Jones (1936-41: North Shore, 1939: New Zealand)
 Jack Smith
 Ivor Stirling (1937-38: North Shore, 1939: New Zealand)

Other New Zealand representatives

A list of New Zealand representatives who played for North Shore prior to, or after leaving the club.
 Frank Woodward (1909: North Shore, 1910-11: New Zealand)
 Richard Wynyard (1909: North Shore, 1907-08: New Zealand)
 William Wynyard (1909-13: North Shore, 1907-08: New Zealand)
 Lyall Stewart (1926: North Shore, 1924: New Zealand)
 Bob Banham (1938: North Shore, 1939: New Zealand)
 Len Barchard (1933: North Shore, 1930: New Zealand)

Other notable players
 Dennis Hale

North Shore Senior Team Records (1910-1944)
The season record for the most senior men’s team in the club.

Top point scorers and try scorers (1909-1943)
The point scoring lists are compiled from matches played in the first grade championship, Roope Rooster, Phelan Shield and Stormont Shield matches which involved all first grade sides. It does not include additional one off type matches such as those against non-Auckland teams or charity matches. Len Scott scored 99 tries for North Shore in 1st grade competition games but scored 8 other tries in matches for North Shore in other fixtures for 108 total tries.

Club Titles

Grade championships and lower grade knockout competitions (1910-1944)

 1911 Third Grade Open
 1912 Fourth Grade
 1913 First Grade
 1914 First Grade
 1916 Fifth Grade
 1917 Fifth Grade & Sixth Grade A
 1918 Third Grade Open
 1923 Fourth Grade A
 1926 Second Grade
 1927 Second Grade (Wright Cup), Second Grade knockout (Foster Shield). Fourth Grade knockout, and Sixth Grade knockout (Hammill Cup).
 1928 First Grade & Second Grade
 1929 Second Grade, Third Grade Intermediate, & Fourth Grade A
 1931 Reserve Grade
 1932 First Grade
 1933 First Grade & Sixth Grade A
 1936 Schoolboys Intermediate
 1937 Seventh Grade
 1941 First Grade

Other titles

 1915 Roope Rooster
 1930 Stormont Shield
 1931 Roope Rooster, Stormont Shield, & Norton Cup
 1933 Stormont Shield
 1940 Stormont Shield
 1945 Roope Rooster & Stormont Shield
 1954 Roope Rooster & Stormont Shield
 1973 Norton Cup
 1990 Norton Cup
 1991 Norton Cup

Gallery

References

Auckland rugby league clubs
Rugby clubs established in 1909
Sports clubs disestablished in 2005
1909 establishments in New Zealand
2005 disestablishments in New Zealand